Cynoscephalae was a village of ancient Boeotia in the Cynoscephalae Hills. It was noted as the birthplace of Pindar.

References

Populated places in ancient Boeotia
Former populated places in Greece